Eristalotabanus is a genus of biting horseflies of the family Tabanidae.

Distribution
Ecuador.

Species
Eristalotabanus violaceus Kröber, 1931

References

Tabanidae
Diptera of South America
Endemic fauna of Ecuador
Taxa named by Otto Kröber
Brachycera genera